Here WeGo is a web mapping and navigation service, operated by HERE Technologies and originally developed by Nokia. In 2013, HERE Technologies released this web mapping application for Windows Phone and the World Wide Web as a revamped version of Nokia Maps. HERE Technologies released the HERE Maps application to the Android platform on December 10, 2014 and later for iOS on March 11, 2015. The company changed the product name to HERE WeGo in July 2016. It is the default maps service provider for the Amazon Fire tablets and smartphones.

Here WeGo is based on the HERE platform, a fully integrated location data platform. HERE Technologies provided its in-house data, which includes satellite views, traffic data, and other location services. Maps are updated every two or three months.

Timeline and availability

Nokia/Ovi Maps
In 2006, Nokia purchased a Berlin-based start-up, Gate5, with a mapping software called smart2go. In February 2007 Nokia announced that smart2go would be available free on the S60 Symbian platform and on Windows Mobile 5.0. It was pre-installed on handsets, including Nokia N95, which featured Global Positioning System (GPS) technology. In August 2007 the smart2go application was reworked into Ovi Maps, named under the new umbrella Ovi brand, released for S60 3rd Edition devices. Months later, Nokia bought Navteq, a provider of digital map systems.

Ovi Maps version 2.0 went into public beta in February 2008 and was released in May. Version 3.0 was released in July 2009.

Turn-by-turn navigation and traffic information originally required a subscription, but in January 2010 Nokia announced that these would be provided for free. In 2011 it became Nokia Maps. It was released for Nokia Lumia in November 2011, coming preloaded on the devices. Versions for the Nokia N900 and Nokia N9 were also made.

Here Maps
In November 2012, Nokia rebranded Nokia Maps as HERE Maps. The rebranded version was first released for iOS and later in February 2013 for all Windows Phone 8 devices. It was also released on the Nokia Asha platform and Firefox OS. The legacy Symbian and Series 40 versions carried using the old name without HERE branding.

The HERE application was first announced for Android as a beta test version for some Samsung Galaxy smartphones on August 29, 2014. The app was downloadable on October 8, 2014 from Samsung's Galaxy Apps Store. It was also launched on the same day for the Samsung Gear S smartwatch. The first public release of the beta Here app (across all of the Android platform was on October 21, 2014, as an APK download from the HERE.com Web site. The app became available in the Google Play store on December 10, 2014. On February 12, 2015 a stable version of HERE was released on the Google Play store.

The Web site wego.here.com (formerly here.com) evolved out of the maps.ovi.com and then maps.nokia.com site and provides the web companion to the HERE suite. It works on all major browsers. Users can organize their favorite places on collections and sync to mobile devices. The Web application also uses WebGL to offer 3D map views without a plugin. With 3D goggles, users can get stereoscopic views of 25 cities. It also provides detailed street-level imaging for many cities. As of 2013, the Web site offers routing support between many waypoints, city pages of over fifty popular cities showing local time and weather conditions, along with information from Lonely Planet and suggested places, 3D maps of 25 cities, with routing support. It also offers live traffic flow visualization, public transport search, and synchronization of user's points of interest (Collections) between the Web site and mobile device. Additionally, it shows heat maps to visualize areas popular for food, nightlife, shopping and local sights in select cities, listing and managing businesses.

On 9 July 2015 HERE launched a new public beta of its Android app. As of June 2015 the Here app was available as a free app in 118 countries and territories across the world for the Android and iOS platforms. On 3 September 2015 Here announced that its app would be available for the Samsung Gear S2 when the smartwatch is released later this fall.

In late 2015 Facebook began using HERE's maps for their applications, moving from Microsoft's map offering, Bing.

In December 2015, Here, at the time a division of Nokia, was sold to a consortium of German automotive companies (comprising Audi AG, BMW AG and Daimler AG) as Here Global BV.

On 15 March 2016 HERE announced that it would discontinue support for its app for Windows 10 Mobile on 29 March 2016 due to its use of "a workaround that will no longer be effective after June 30, 2016", and that the existing Windows Phone 8 app will only receive critical updates after this date and no longer be actively developed. HERE Maps licensed by Microsoft are still offered as part of the existing Bing Maps-based software on these devices.

Here WeGo
On 27 July 2016 the mapping service was updated and re-branded HERE WeGo; the update first launched on Android, and is followed by an iOS version and a relaunch of the web version. The update and rebranding focuses on navigation capabilities, including the addition of taxi fare information in some cities, and integration with Daimler's Car2Go service. Tizen smartphone and smartwatch apps have been rebranded, too.
In April 2020 HERE WeGo introduced CarPlay integration for iOS. The Android version was also published in Huawei AppGallery.
As a response to COVID-19 delivery tools demand, HERE WeGo Deliver product was launched.

Features
Some features are available offline with a downloaded map, others require a data connection, and some also require the user to be signed in.

Turn-by-turn navigation
HERE WeGo provides turn-by-turn navigation in both offline and online modes. Users can enter a destination address, landmark, or business name, and then the app automatically calculates directions and distance to the destination. Real-time traffic data (where available) is also factored and a prediction made on arrival time to the destination.

Depending on the smartphone model, HERE WeGo provides pre-recorded navigation voices as well as text-to-speech commands with street names.

Public transport, pedestrian, and bicycle navigation
Public transport data is displayed by the Here app whilst planning a route while online, for transport options such as buses, trams, subways and trains. Walking and cycling routes are also supported. Time and distance estimates are provided for these modes, and driving navigation.

Real-time traffic and reversible lane traffic
 HERE WeGo had real-time information on traffic conditions and incidents available for 63 countries.

In late June 2015 HERE added real-time traffic for reversible express lanes across the United States and Europe.

'Collections' and location sharing
Users can save the location and details of destinations as 'Collections' if they are online and signed in. It is not possible to store destinations offline, on the device. Location and destination can be shared with standard platform tool.  there was no option to sort collections by name or distance in the Web, Android, and iOS versions.

Offline maps
HERE WeGo can download maps of countries and regions to internal storage so that a data connection is not needed for navigation. Online usage provides live traffic data and additional venue information.

The maps include floor-by-floor details of some large indoor venues such as shopping malls and airports.

CarPlay and Android Auto
If a car is equipped with CarPlay connectivity component, HERE WeGo application on iPhone can be projected to the car in-dash navigation screen and controlled as any other built-in application. Since July 2022, the beta version of the android app is compatible with Android Auto, working with an android phone and a car equipped with Android Auto connectivity component in the same way that the iPhone version.

Future coverage
There is a web page "HERE car drive schedule - Drive schedule for our map data collection cars", with entries typically for the current and following month.

Download statistics
Statistics published by HERE state that it reached one million downloads on the Android platform a couple of weeks after launch and, 12 weeks after its launch, reached 2.5 million downloads, increasing to 3 million by mid-February 2015, and to 4 million through the Google Play store alone by March 2015. By 4 August 2015  Google Play downloads had increased to 5 million, and to 10 million by early 2016.

Previous versions

Symbian^3/Belle

Here was available on the Symbian^3 platform under the name Nokia Maps. The last version, 3.09, included:
Driving and walking turn-by-turn with international voice guidance
Live traffic rerouting in some countries
Live traffic visualisation on the map in some countries
Third-party content such as ViaMichelin and Lonely Planet
Social networking service integration
Support for preloading street maps for offline use
Users can report errors in the maps (from version 3.03 except on Nokia E66 and E71 models)
Local weather conditions by the hour and forecasts for the week
Night View mod
Satellite maps and terrain maps
3D buildings and 3D maps
Public transport routing in some cities
Saving of favourites
City Lens (augmented reality) (Beta only)

Nokia said that the Nokia 808 from 2012 would be the last Symbian phone; Symbian development then stopped. Accenture was responsible for maintenance of Symbian and Nokia Maps until 2016.

The supported phones were:
Version 3.09 (12 November 2012, also called Maps Suite 2.0): only for Symbian Belle phones (500, 603, 700, 701, N8-00, E7-00, C7-00, C6-01, X7-00, E6-00)
Version 3.08 (15 November 2011) and 3.07: supported on Symbian^3
Version 3.06 (2 December 2010): Symbian S60v5 (N97, N97 mini, X6, C6-00, 5800XM, 5235 & 5230, etc.)
Version 3.04 (20 May 2010): Symbian S60v3 FP2

Asha/S40
Maps for S40 were limited compared to other platforms. The maps were streamed online into the device or pre-downloaded with Nokia Suite. In some markets the phones were sold with an SD card preloaded with local maps. The system did not support turn-by-turn navigation. Asha series phones did not have GPS receivers; positioning was done by Cell ID of the cellular network or by using the Wi-Fi positioning system.

See also
TomTom
Comparison of satellite navigation software
Comparison of web map services

References

2015 software
Android (operating system) software
iOS software
Symbian software
Mobile route-planning software
Nokia services
Web mapping
Windows Phone software